Heteroclinus is a genus of clinids found in the western Indo-Pacific.

Species
There are currently 16 recognized species in this genus:
 Heteroclinus adelaidae Castelnau, 1872 (Adelaide's weedfish)
 Heteroclinus antinectes (Günther, 1861) (Natal weedfish)
 Heteroclinus eckloniae (McKay, 1970) (Kelp weedfish)
 Heteroclinus equiradiatus (Milward, 1960) (Sevenbar weedfish)
 Heteroclinus heptaeolus (J. D. Ogilby, 1885) (Ogilby's weedfish)
 Heteroclinus johnstoni (Saville-Kent, 1886) (Johnston's weedfish)
 Heteroclinus kuiteri Hoese & Rennis, 2006
 Heteroclinus macrophthalmus Hoese, 1976 (Large-eye weedfish)
 Heteroclinus marmoratus (Klunzinger, 1872) (Slender weedfish)
 Heteroclinus nasutus, (Günther, 1861) (Large-nose weedfish)
 Heteroclinus perspicillatus (Valenciennes, 1836) (Common weedfish)
 Heteroclinus puellarum (E. O. G. Scott, 1955) (Little weedfish)
 Heteroclinus roseus (Günther, 1861) (Rosy weedfish)
 Heteroclinus tristis (Klunzinger, 1872) (Sharp-nose weedfish)
 Heteroclinus whiteleggii (J. D. Ogilby, 1894) (Whitelegg's weedfish)
 Heteroclinus wilsoni (A. H. S. Lucas, 1891) (Wilson's weedfish)

References

 
Clinidae
Marine fish genera
Taxa named by François-Louis Laporte, comte de Castelnau